Anaerospora is a Gram-negative genus of bacteria from the family of Sporomusaceae with one known species (Anaerospora hongkongensis).

References

 

Negativicutes
Bacteria genera